This is a list of films produced/distributed by the defunct British television company, ITC Entertainment.  This list also includes films distributed by Associated Film Distribution.

1970s

1980s

1990s

References

ITC Entertainment